Cameron Johnson (born May 24, 1990) is a former American football outside linebacker and defensive end. He was a two-sport star at Gonzaga College High School (basketball and football) in Washington, DC. He then played college football at Virginia, and was drafted by the San Francisco 49ers in the seventh round of the 2012 NFL Draft.

High school career
Johnson attended Gonzaga High School in Washington, D.C., U.S. He played both wide receiver and defensive back. As a senior, he caught 22 passes for 269 yards and two touchdowns. He was named to the second-team all-conference at wide receiver. He was also a standout basketball player, earning all-conference honors.

Considered only a three-star recruit by Rivals.com, he was rated as the No.40 safety prospect in the nation. He accepted a scholarship to Virginia over other offers from Georgia, Duke, Miami, Syracuse, Pittsburgh, and Maryland.

College career
As a freshman in 2008, he played in 6 games, mostly as a reserve linebacker and on special teams. He recorded 7 total tackles, including 2 tackles for loss. In 2009, he played in all 12 games for the Cavaliers, starting in 10 of them as an outside linebacker.  He recorded 40 tackles including 5 tackles for loss and 2 sacks. In 2010, the Cavaliers defense switched their scheme from a 3-4 to a 4-3, allowing Johnson to move from outside linebacker to defensive end. As a junior in 2010, he started in 12 games, and recorded his best statistical season of his career.  He recorded 53 total tackles, including 14.5 for loss and 6.5 sacks, he also recovered two fumbles. In 2011, his final season, his performance dropped off due to several nagging injuries, but still managed to start in all 12 games. He recorded 30 total tackles, including 11 tackles for loss and 4 sacks, he also forced two fumbles, one of which was recovered.

College statistics

Professional career

San Francisco 49ers

Johnson was drafted by the San Francisco 49ers in the seventh round (237th overall) of the 2012 NFL Draft.

Indianapolis Colts
Johnson was acquired by the Indianapolis Colts via trade with the San Francisco 49ers in exchange for a conditional draft pick on September 2, 2013. On September 5, 2015, Johnson was waived by the Colts.

Cleveland Browns
On September 22, 2015, Johnson was signed to the Cleveland Browns' practice squad. On September 4, 2016, he was waived by the Browns.

Arizona Cardinals
On September 27, 2016, Johnson was signed to the Arizona Cardinals' practice squad.

Second stint with Browns
Johnson was signed by the Cleveland Browns off the Cardinals' practice squad on October 1, 2016. He was waived on August 29, 2017.

Detroit Lions
On January 8, 2018, Johnson signed a reserve/future contract with the Detroit Lions. He was released on August 31, 2018.

References

External links

  Virginia Cavaliers profile
 San Francisco 49ers profile

1990 births
Living people
American football defensive ends
American football linebackers
Gonzaga College High School alumni
Virginia Cavaliers football players
San Francisco 49ers players
Indianapolis Colts players
Players of American football from Washington, D.C.
Cleveland Browns players
Arizona Cardinals players
Detroit Lions players